Astrothelium megatropicum is a species of corticolous (bark-dwelling), crustose lichen in the family Trypetheliaceae. Found in Guyana, it was formally described as a new species in 2016 by Dutch lichenologist André Aptroot. The lichen has a smooth and somewhat shiny, pale ochraceous-green thallus with a cortex and a thin (about 0.1 mm wide) black prothallus line. The presence of the lichen does not induce the formation of galls in the host plant. No lichen products were detected from collected specimens using thin-layer chromatography. The spores, which have three septa and diamond-shaped cavities, are the longest 3-septate ascospores in the Trypetheliaceae.

References

megatropicum
Lichen species
Lichens described in 2016
Lichens of Guyana
Taxa named by André Aptroot